Sergap is a criminal news program that aired on RCTI and rerun on iNews in Indonesia. This criminal news program was launched on 2 October 2001 and broadcasts criminal news that happens every day.

History 
At the beginning, Sergap RCTI was broadcast twice a week (every Tuesday and Thursday) at 11.00-11.30 WIB. In 2003 Sergap Siang RCTI increased the broadcast frequency to seven times a week while moving broadcast time from 12.30 to 13.00 WIB after the RCTI Bulletin Siang program. On 6 June 2005, due to RCTI's Nuansa Pagi program airing every Monday-Saturday at 05.00 to 06.30 WIB, RCTI introduced the Sergap Pagi program which aired from 06.30 to 07.00 WIB. with different segments with the RCTI Afternoon Pass with the entry of the Halte Sergap segment. Sergap Pagi RCTI was stopped on 31 July 2007 due to poor ratings. On 18 February 2011, the Sergap Siang RCTI officially ended and was replaced by Seputar Peristiwa. On 22 October 2018, Sergap aired again on RCTI after Seputar iNews Pagi.

Segments 
Sergap itself consists of five segments:

 Ungkap - This segment contains the latest criminal and legal news.
 Bidik - This segment explores more deeply about a story whose material is considered strong.
 Justisia - Interactive dialogue around criminal issues.
 Galeri - Feature or story of police officers.
Top Viral (2018–present) - Trending topics of the day.

Bang Napi 
Sergap has also a unique segment, the Bang Napi segment portrayed by Arie Hendrosaputro (sometimes played by Siswanto). On 29 June 2009 there was an episode of Bang Napi Lepas at the end of the segment with Abu Marlo and only a few seconds Bang Napi escaped and returned to prison again. In this segment, Bang Napi delivered messages relating to the news that had been delivered. Bang Napi usually convey a credo at the end of the message, which reads: "Kejahatan tidak selalu terjadi hanya karena niat pelakunya, tetapi juga kesempatan. Waspadalah, waspadalah!" (English: "Because The Criminal not always happens only because the intention of culprit, But there is a chance, Beware! Beware!").

See also 
 Indonesia Today
 Seputar Peristiwa
 Realita
 Lapor Polisi

References 

Indonesian television news shows
Indonesian-language television shows
2001 Indonesian television series debuts
2000s Indonesian television series
RCTI original programming